Babur-e Ajam (also Romanized as Bābūr-e ‘Ajam, Baboor Ajam, and Bābūr ‘Ajam; also known as Bābār, Bāber,  and Bābūr) is a village in Yowla Galdi Rural District, in the Central District of Showt County, West Azerbaijan Province, Iran. At the 2006 census, its population was 602, in 123 families.  
babur or baber means Tiger in Persian language.

References 

Populated places in Showt County